Emekwanem Ogugua Biosah Jr. (born March 29, 1990), known professionally as Maxo Kream, is an American rapper from Houston, Texas. His debut album Punken was released in 2018, and the follow-up and major label debut, Brandon Banks, was released in 2019.

Maxo Kream is known for his honest lyricism, speaking to his past life living in poor neighborhoods within Houston, Texas. He is a member of the 52 Hoover Crips.

Maxo Kream's older brother, KCG Josh, is also a rapper.

Early life and career 
Maxo Kream grew up in Southwest Houston. He is of Nigerian descent through his father, who is a Nigerian immigrant to the U.S. Kream began rapping in high school as part of the group Kream Clicc. In 2012, he started to gain popularity after releasing a remix of Kendrick Lamar's "Rigamortus" on YouTube. His early mixtapes Retro Card and Quicc Strikes pushed him into the limelight, hitting over 85,000 hits on LiveMixtapes. In 2013, he supported Chief Keef on the Texas leg of his tour.

His 2015 mixtape #Maxo187 received attention from XXL Magazine and Pitchfork among others. He followed it up in 2016 with The Persona Tape.

In 2018, he released his debut album Punken.

On June 27, 2019, he signed a deal with Roc Nation.

On July 19, 2019, he released his major label debut, Brandon Banks via Big Persona/88 Classic/RCA Records.

On October 18, 2021, he released his second major label album Weight of the World.

Legal issues 

On October 22, 2016, Maxo Kream was arrested for engaging in "organized crime" under the Racketeer Influenced and Corrupt Organizations Act. He, along with members of the Kream Clicc Gang, held charges sourcing from money laundering, possession of 85 pounds of mariijuana, 2,000 Xanax pills, 13 firearms, cash, and drug manufacturing/distribution paraphernalia. Maxo was held at Fort Bend County Jail in Richmond, Texas. He was released on bail of $200,000 the next day and denied the allegations, claiming to only be "organizing his music". Maxo eventually beat the charges.

Discography

Studio albums

Mixtapes

Singles

As lead artist

As featured artist

Guest appearances

References

External links 
Maxo Kream's Soundcloud

1990 births
Living people
American hip hop musicians
Rappers from Houston
Crips
21st-century American rappers
American people of Nigerian descent
African-American male rappers
21st-century American male musicians
21st-century African-American musicians